The great eared nightjar (Lyncornis macrotis) is a species of nightjar in the family Caprimulgidae. It is found in southwest India and in parts of Southeast Asia. This very large nightjar has long barred wings, a barred tail and long ear-tufts which are often recumbent. It has a white throat band but has no white on its wings or on its tail.

Taxonomy
The great eared nightjar was formally described in 1831 by the Irish zoologist Nicholas Aylward Vigors based on a sample collected in the neighbourhood of Manila in the Philippines. Vigors coined the binomial name Caprimulgus macrotis. The great eared nightjar was formerly placed in the genus Eurostopodus. It and the closely related Malaysian eared nightjar were moved to the resurrected genus Lyncornis based on the results of a molecular phylogenetic study published in 2010 that found large genetic differences between the great eared nightjar and other species in Eurostopodus.

Five subspecies are recognised:
 L. m. cerviniceps Gould, 1838 – Bangladesh and northeastern India to southern China, Indochina and northern Malay Peninsula. 
 L. m. bourdilloni Hume, 1875 – southwestern India. 
 L. m. macrotis (Vigors, 1831) – Philippines (except far west of Visayas; Palawan group, and Sulu Archipelago).
 L. m. jacobsoni Junge, 1936 – Simeulue (west of north Sumatra). 
 L. m. macropterus Bonaparte, 1850 – Sulawesi, Sangihe and Talaud Islands (northeast of Sulawesi), Banggai and Sula Island (east of Sulawesi).

Description

Distribution and habitat
It is found in South Asia and Southeast Asia with populations in the Western Ghats and Sri Lanka, Bangladesh, India, Indonesia, Laos, Malaysia, Myanmar, the Philippines, Thailand, and Vietnam. Its natural habitat is subtropical or moist lowland tropical forests.

Behaviour
Like other nightjars they are active at dusk and at night. They have a distinctive call which includes a sharp tsiik followed by a pause and a two-syllable ba-haaww.

Breeding
The nest is a scrape on the ground and the clutch consists of a single egg. The chick is well camouflaged among leaf litter.

References

External links
 Internet Bird Collection
 Malayalam

great eared nightjar
Birds of Southeast Asia
great eared nightjar
Taxa named by Nicholas Aylward Vigors
Taxonomy articles created by Polbot